Ayutla Mixtec is a Mixtec language of Guerrero. It's divergent, with a number of words unlike other varieties of Mixtec. It is spoken mainly by people living in the outlying settlements of Ayutla de los Libres, Guerero, Mexico.

References 

Mixtec language